The siege of Caxias was a siege during the Brazilian War of Independence in which the Brazilian Army under the command of José Pereira Filgueiras attempted to capture the city of Caxias in Maranhão, which was defended by the Portuguese Army of João José da Cunha Fidié. The siege lasted from 23 May 1823 until 31 July 1823, when the Portuguese surrendered to the Brazilian forces after the combats that occurred between 17 July and 19 July that severely reduced its numbers. The event marked the beginning of the Portuguese forces'  collapse in Maranhão.

References

Bibliography
 
 

Military history of Brazil
Caxias
1823 in Brazil
Conflicts in 1823
Caxias
May 1823 events
June 1823 events
July 1823 events